Kalakshetra Manipur, is an Indian theatre group located in Manipur It was established on 19 July 1969 by Heisnam Kanhailal as Founder and Director and his wife Heisnam Sabitri as co-founder. It has been registered under Societies' Registration Act XXI of 1860 with its No. 1149 of 1972. Their eldest son Heisnam Tomba has taken over as the current Director.

Overview

The main objective: To study, revive and project the culture of Manipur through the art of theatre and to set highest standards of performance to match not only the best in India but the world theatre scene.

Kalakshetra Manipur believes in the notion of a workshop that is a laboratory or research theatre rather than a production company it began its experiment in a continuous process of 'renewal of ancestral tradition' for a contemporary cultural expression as they are all the progeny of an ethno - social tradition of Manipur. The artists of the group endeavored to learn afresh the native lore traveling throughout the nook and corner of Manipur and strengthened their creative will.
They created the performances for the 'work-in-progress' shows rather than 'Public Theatre'-a finished  production for public exhibition.

Besides, the group launched cultural expedition in organizing theatre events with the non-actors in three different socio - cultural contexts. They were: (i)performance of NUPI LAN (Women's war of Manipur, 1939)in which market women around one hundred from women's market of Imphal town took the active participation in December, 1978 as players, (ii)At Umathel, a sleepy village in the remote corner of southern Manipur SANJENNAHA (cowherd) was performed by the villagers themselves in December, 1979, and (iii)Introduced theatre in the tribal area of Paite community of Churachandpur district with the production of THANGHOU LEH LIANDOU performed by tribal youths in March, 1980.

Along with the training and research programmes the group created remarkable performances that stood out as milestone of an originally alternate theatre.

Heisnam Kanhailal was awarded the Padma Shri award by Government of India in 2004 for his work. The Government of India awarded Heisnam Sabitri the fourth highest civilian honour of the Padma Shri, in 2008, for her contributions to Manipuri theatre.

Major Production 

Besides the above, short improvisations and performances were created as part of the process of training and research. The group toured throughout India for the last 25 years for staging its shows. In abroad too like Japan, Singapore, Malaysia, Indonesia, Bangladesh, Egypt.

At Cairo in 1991 at the International Festival for Experimental Theatre Sabitri Heisnam won the Best Actress Award of the panel of critics in her performance in Migi Sharang(Human Cage). The group worked with different ethnic groups from September, 2005 to August, 2006 and produced two multi-lingual plays, Sati and Dakhgar, as directed by H.Tomba and H.Kanhailal respectively.

See also
 Shumang Kumhei

References 

Booklet "PROFILE, Kalakshetra Manipur,Imphal, India," published by Kalakshetra Manipur
The Theater of Kanhailal (Pebet & Memoirs of Africa), Rustom Bharucha, Seagull Books 1992
"Theater in Manipur Today," Seagull Theater Quarterly, Issue 14/15, June/Sept 1997
"Theatre for the ritual of suffering (a project)"mphal, India : Heisnam Publications, 1997

External links
 Heisnam Kanhailal, Profile

Theatrical organisations in India
Culture of Manipur
Drama schools in India
Organizations established in 1969